Middlebourne is a town in Tyler County, West Virginia, United States. The population was 715 at the 2020 census. It serves as the county seat of Tyler County.

History
Middlebourne was established by an enactment of the Virginia General Assembly in 1813.  Two explanations have been given for the name of the town:  One is that it was located halfway between Pennsylvania and a series of salt wells along the Kanawha River upstream of Charleston; the other is that it is located midway between the source and the mouth of Middle Island Creek, which flows through the town.

The Tyler County Courthouse and Jail is listed on the National Register of Historic Places.

Geography
Middlebourne is located at  (39.493966, -80.905751).

Climate
The climate in this area is characterized by hot, humid summers and cold winters.  According to the Köppen Climate Classification system, Middlebourne has a humid continental climate, abbreviated "Cfd" on climate maps.

Demographics

2010 census
At the 2010 census there were 815 people, 360 households, and 228 families living in the town. The racial makeup of the town was 99.3% White and 0.7% from two or more races. Hispanic or Latino of any race were 0.2%.

Of the 360 households 27.8% had children under the age of 18 living with them, 47.2% were married couples living together, 11.7% had a female householder with no husband present, 4.4% had a male householder with no wife present, and 36.7% were non-families. 35.3% of households were one person and 14.2% were one person aged 65 or older. The average household size was 2.25 and the average family size was 2.87.

The median age in the town was 42.5 years. 23.7% of residents were under the age of 18; 6.4% were between the ages of 18 and 24; 22.7% were from 25 to 44; 29% were from 45 to 64; and 18% were 65 or older. The gender makeup of the town was 46.0% male and 54.0% female.

2000 census
At the 2000 census there were 870 people, 370 households, and 247 families living in the town. The population density was 2,320.0 inhabitants per square mile (907.9/km). There were 402 housing units at an average density of 1,072.0 per square mile (419.5/km).  The racial makeup of the town was 99.54% White, and 0.46% from two or more races.
Of the 370 households 30.0% had children under the age of 18 living with them, 51.9% were married couples living together, 11.9% had a female householder with no husband present, and 33.2% were non-families. 31.4% of households were one person and 16.8% were one person aged 65 or older. The average household size was 2.31 and the average family size was 2.89.

The age distribution was 23.3% under the age of 18, 7.5% from 18 to 24, 25.1% from 25 to 44, 28.7% from 45 to 64, and 15.4% 65 or older. The median age was 42 years. For every 100 females, there were 85.1 males. For every 100 females age 18 and over, there were 80.3 males.

The median household income was $128,704 and the median family income  was $40,893. Males had a median income of $35,000 versus $19,167 for females. The per capita income for the town was $14,673. About 12.6% of families and 13.9% of the population were below the poverty line, including 18.3% of those under age 18 and 11.9% of those age 65 or over.

References

County seats in West Virginia
Populated places established in 1813
Towns in West Virginia
Towns in Tyler County, West Virginia